William Ignatius Nolan (May 14, 1874 – August 3, 1943) was a politician from the U.S. State of Minnesota. He represented the state in the U.S. House of Representatives.

Nolan was born in Saint Paul, Minnesota and served in the Minnesota National Guard from 1891 to 1896.

He was  member of the Minnesota House of Representatives from 1903 to 1907, 1911–1913, and 1917–1923, serving as speaker from 1919–1923. He was Lieutenant Governor of Minnesota from 1925–1929. Nolan was the chairman of the Minnesota Reforestation Commission in 1927.
 
Nolan was elected as a Republican to the 71st congress to fill the vacancy caused by the resignation of Walter Newton. Nolan was reelected to the 72nd congress and served from June 17, 1929, to March 4, 1933. He was an unsuccessful candidate for reelection in 1932 to the 73rd congress and continued to be an unsuccessful candidate for nomination in 1934, 1936, and 1938. Nolan  resumed his profession as a lecturer. He was elected State railroad and warehouse commissioner in 1942 and served until his death in Winona, Minnesota.

References
Minnesota Historical Society
Minnesota Legislators Past and Present

Speakers of the Minnesota House of Representatives
Republican Party members of the Minnesota House of Representatives
1874 births
1943 deaths
Politicians from Saint Paul, Minnesota
Lieutenant Governors of Minnesota
Republican Party members of the United States House of Representatives from Minnesota
Minnesota National Guard personnel